Birdwell & Hoyland Common railway station was a railway station on the South Yorkshire Railway's Blackburn Valley line between  and . The station was intended to serve the villages of Pilley, Birdwell and Hoyland Common, near Barnsley, South Yorkshire, England although the original chosen site was moved half a mile nearer towards Barnsley to serve the purposes of the Earl of Wharncliffe who was, at that time, sinking Wharncliffe Silkstone Colliery nearby. This move away made the station less convenient for most of the population.

The station was opened in February 1855, the building having an ornate canopy over its entrance and the buildings containing a private waiting room for the use of the Earl of Wharncliffe. 
Closure came on 7 December 1953.

Route

References 
The South Yorkshire Railway, D.L.Franks, Turntable Enterprises 1971. 

Disused railway stations in Barnsley
Railway stations in Great Britain opened in 1855
Railway stations in Great Britain closed in 1953
Former South Yorkshire Railway stations